Daniel Ingram may refer to:

 Daniel Ingram (composer) (born 1975), Canadian composer and songwriter
 Dan Ingram (Daniel Trombley "Dan" Ingram) (1934–2018), American radio disc jockey

See also 
 Ingram (surname)